The Chicken Squad is an American computer-animated children's television series created by Tom Rogers that premiered on Disney Junior on May 14, 2021. It is based on the books written by Doreen Cronin. The series features the voices of Yvette Nicole Brown, Ramone Hamilton, Gabriella Graves and Maxwell Simkins. The series theme song is performed by former Kids Incorporated star Renee Sands.

Premise
The show follows Coop, Little Boo and Sweetie – a trio of young chicken siblings – and their mentor Captain Tully, a retired search and rescue dog, who use teamwork and critical thinking skills to solve problems and keep the peace in their neighborhood. 

If an animal, mostly referred to as a "critter", needs the aid of the Chicken Squad, he/she can summon them through an electronic sounding device. Upon hearing that critter's report, the Chicken Squad head to their headquarters, which is their home actually, where they would don their uniforms, and gether certain equipment.

To get to certain places, the Chicken Squad has forms of transportation. One of their vehicles is a car which they won in a basketball tournament. Coop would later build other vehicles such as a motorcycle and a helicopter.

Whenever a character thinks of something, his/her thought bubble can be seen and edited by anyone around.

Characters

Main
 Captain Tully (voiced by Yvette Nicole Brown) is a retired search and rescue dog with two different colored eyes (blue on a left and brown on the right), and mentor to the trio. Long before getting her job, she was a stray pup until she met a dog who took her to a dog school where she received food and shelter.
 Coop (voiced by Ramone Hamilton) is the tech-savvy chicken.
 Sweetie (voiced by Gabriella Graves) is the strong chicken.
 Little Boo (voiced by Maxwell Simkins) is the speedy chicken.

Recurring
 Frazz (voiced by Tony Hale) is a tea-loving squirrel.
 Dr. Dirt (voiced by Jane Lynch) is a forensic scientist snail. She does not call other characters by name, but instead nicknames them (“Strong Chicklet” for Sweetie, "Captain Woof Woof" for Captain Tully, etc.) Whenever the view is not on her, she would quickly but mysteriously move from one location to another.
 Pumpkin (voiced by Mimi Ryder) is a shy female cat.
 Pinky (voiced by Serenity Reign Brown) is a female pink pig.
 Dinah (voiced by Melissa Rauch) is the chicks' mother.
 Riley (voiced by Sean Giambrone) is a gruff pack rat who is Frazz’s roommate. Before moving in with Frazz, he lived in a hollow tree with a ground level entrance which makes the place prone to flooding during rainy weather.
 Lt. Scruffy (voiced by Malcolm-Jamal Warner) is a retired firehouse dog.
 Snick and Wheeze (voiced by Zack Pearlman and Melissa Villaseñor respectively) are two mischievous brown raccoons. They live in the attic of a human house.
 Maizie (voiced by Alison Fernandez) is a cute but crooked sheep who is the main antagonist of the series.
 Nibbles (voiced by Jeff Bennett) is a hare with fondness for vegetables.
 Scout (voiced by Jack Stanton) is a happy-go-lucky puppy.
 Gizmo (voiced by Olivia Jellen) is a tech-savvy young vixen.
 Monty (voiced by Henry Kaufman) is a black pony.
 Ramona (voiced by Lily Sanfelippo) is a goat who is a close friend of Monty.
 Queen Bae (voiced by Alanna Ubach) is a honey bee who runs a hive where Rebeeca resides. She has a sister who also runs a hive.
 Endicott (voiced by Nat Faxon) is a lizard with a large vocabulary, and a passion for art.

Guests
 Rebeecca (voiced by Rachel Bloom) — A nervous honeybee.
 Quilla (voiced by Chrissie Fit) — A friendly porcupine.
 Cornelius (voiced by Jet Jurgensmeyer) — The Chicken Squad's cousin who paints pictures at high fidelity that anyone who sees his works could mistake them for reality.
 Dash and Chance (voiced by Luke Lowe and Addison Andrews respectively) — Two grey raccoons who are the younger cousins of Snick and Wheeze. They are committed to follow the footsteps of their older relatives.

Episodes

References

External links

2020s American animated television series
2021 American television series debuts
2022 American television series endings
American children's animated adventure television series
American children's animated comedy television series
American computer-animated television series
American preschool education television series
English-language television shows
Disney Junior original programming
Disney animated television series
Television series about chickens
Animated television series about children
Animated television series about siblings
Television series by Disney
Animated preschool education television series
2020s preschool education television series
Television shows set in North Dakota